Gurvinder Singh (born 12 June 1983) is an Indian cricketer. He made his first-class debut for Himachal Pradesh in the 2010–11 Ranji Trophy on 24 November 2010.

He was the leading wicket-taker for Himachal Pradesh in the 2017–18 Ranji Trophy, with 20 dismissals in six matches.

References

External links
 

1983 births
Living people
Indian cricketers
Himachal Pradesh cricketers
People from Sirmaur district